Fotopoulos or Photopoulos (sometimes for female persons it becomes: Fotopoulou or Photopoulou) is a Greek surname. Notable people with the surname include:

 Danielle Fotopoulos (born 1976), soccer player, US women's national soccer team
 George Fotopoulos, former head coach of the LSU women's soccer team
 Helen Fotopulos, Montreal city councillor
 James Fotopoulos (born 1976), American independent filmmaker
 Mimis Fotopoulos (1913-1986), Greek actor
 Takis Fotopoulos (born 1940), Greek political writer and editor
 Vassilis Photopoulos (1934-2007), Greek painter and film director

Greek-language surnames
Surnames